Jeon Sae-yan (born ) is a South Korean female volleyball player. She is part of the South Korea women's national volleyball team.

Career 
She participated at the   2017 FIVB Volleyball Women's World Grand Champions Cup.

Clubs 
  Korea Expressway Corporation, 2017

References

External links 
 FIVB Profile
 Coppa KOVO F.: Trofeo alle GS Caltex di Diouck
 Tokio, Japan. Credit: MATSUO. 6. Sep 2017. Jeon Saeyan (KOR) Volleyball: FIVB World Grand Champions Cup 2017 Frauen Match zwischen Südkorea 0-3 USA auf der Tokyo Metropolitan Gymnasium in Tokio, Japan. Credit: MATSUO. K/LBA SPORT/Alamy leben Nachrichten Stockfoto, Bild: 157775253

1997 births
Living people
South Korean women's volleyball players